Holocaust Studies: A Journal of Culture and History is a quarterly peer-reviewed academic journal covering Holocaust studies. It was formerly known as The Journal of Holocaust Education (1995-2004) and the British Journal of Holocaust Education (1992-1994). It is published by Routledge. It is associated with the British Association for Holocaust Studies. The journal is abstracted and indexed in Scopus.

References

External links

Routledge academic journals

Academic journals about the Holocaust
Quarterly journals
English-language journals
Publications established in 1992